Kompyang Sujana Stadium is a multi-purpose stadium in Denpasar, Bali, Indonesia, and the home of Indonesia Liga 3 club Perseden Denpasar. It has a capacity of 7,000 spectators.

In 2021, the field renovation has been carried out. Stadium lighting was changed to international standards, drainage channels were also renovated, and lights were changed to 800 lux in preparation for the U-20 World Cup in Indonesia.

References

Denpasar
Sport in Bali
Sports venues in Denpasar
Football venues in Indonesia
Football venues in Bali
Football venues in Denpasar
Buildings and structures in Denpasar
Buildings and structures in Bali